Luneray is a commune in the Seine-Maritime department in the Normandy region in northern France.

Geography
The commune is also served by the TER railway.

Heraldry

Population

Places of interest
 The church of Notre-Dame, dating from the sixteenth century.
 An eighteenth-century Protestant church. Luneray is one of the few Norman communes to have a significant Protestant population. The first French Sunday school was opened Luneray, August 7, 1814 by Pastor Laurent Cadoret, who built the temple with his parishioners

See also
Communes of the Seine-Maritime department

References

Communes of Seine-Maritime